Woźniki  is a town in Lubliniec County, Silesian Voivodeship, Poland, with 4,305 inhabitants (2019).

It is situated in the historic Upper Silesia region, close to the border with Lesser Poland. According to legend, a Silesian fortress on the nearby Grojec mountain was devastated during the Mongol invasion of Poland in 1241, whereafter the inhabitants moved to the present location. Nevertheless, the settlement was first mentioned in a 1206 deed issued by Bishop Fulko of Kraków. It received market rights from the Upper Silesian Dukes of Opole, town privileges were confirmed by Duke Bernard of Niemodlin in 1454.

With most of Silesia it was annexed by Prussia in 1742, and after the Napoleonic Wars became an important border town close to Russian Congress Poland – Emperor Alexander I passed it on his way to the 1815 Congress of Vienna. The Woischnik estates were a possession of the Henckel von Donnersmarck noble family until the town passed to the Silesian Voivodeship of the Second Polish Republic upon the Upper Silesia plebiscite in 1921. In Wozniki lived famous Silesian writer Jozef Lompa.

Twin towns – sister cities
See twin towns of Gmina Woźniki.

References

External links

 Official website

Cities and towns in Silesian Voivodeship
Lubliniec County
Silesian Voivodeship (1920–1939)